Marcus Held (born 15 October 1977) is a German politician. Born in Ludwigshafen, Rhineland-Palatinate, he represents the SPD. Marcus Held has served as a member of the Bundestag from the state of Rhineland-Palatinate from 2013 to October 2021.

Life 
He became member of the bundestag after the 2013 German federal election.

Since 2020 Held is Part of a political scandal.

References

External links 

  
 Bundestag biography 

1977 births
Living people
Members of the Bundestag for Rhineland-Palatinate
Members of the Bundestag 2017–2021
Members of the Bundestag for the Social Democratic Party of Germany